Asia Education Foundation (AEF) is a joint activity of Asialink to promote Asian literacy within Australian schools. AEF strives for Asian literacy not only in language, but knowledge in geography, history, literature, mathematics, science and culture. Together with Asialink, AEF offers a multitude of programs for educators and principals to travel to the Asia, thereby expanding their knowledge in the region.

In recent years, the AEF formed the Business Alliance for Asia Literacy and Education Alliance for Asia Literacy. Both are composed of major corporations, peak bodies, as well as education and community organisations. These alliances seek to shift the Australian school curriculum with a greater focus on the Asian region.

A major program by AEF is the Asia Literacy Ambassadors project, which partners professional business leaders with secondary schools.  By sharing their stories, these skilled professionals educate students about the larger scope of employment opportunities available to Asia engaged individuals.

Notes

External links
 The University of Melbourne
  Asialink
Asia Education Foundation

University of Melbourne
Educational organisations based in Australia
Think tanks based in Australia
Universities in Victoria (Australia)
International relations
Foundations based in Australia
Australia–Asia relations
1992 establishments in Australia